1073 Gellivara, provisional designation , is a dark Themistian asteroid, approximately  in diameter, located in the outer regions of the asteroid belt. It was discovered by Austrian astronomer Johann Palisa at the Vienna Observatory on 14 September 1923, and later named after the Swedish town of Gällivare.

Orbit and classification 

Gellivara is a Themistian asteroid that belongs to the Themis family, a very large family of carbonaceous asteroids, named after 24 Themis. It orbits the Sun in the outer asteroid belt at a distance of 2.6–3.8 AU once every 5 years and 8 months (2,079 days; semi-major axis of 3.19 AU). Its orbit has an eccentricity of 0.19 and an inclination of 2° with respect to the ecliptic. The body's observation arc begins at Vienna on 1 October 1923, two weeks after its official discovery observation.

Naming 

This minor planet was named by Austrian astronomer Joseph Rheden with the consent of the discoverer's second wife, Anna Palisa, after the small Swedish town of Gällivare in Lapland, where astronomers witnessed the total eclipse of the Sun in 1927. Gellivara was the discoverer's last discovery. The official naming citation was mentioned in The Names of the Minor Planets by Paul Herget in 1955.

Physical characteristics 

Gellivara is an assumed carbonaceous C-type asteroid, which agrees with the overall spectral type of the Themis family.

Rotation period 

In November 2008, a rotational lightcurve of Gellivara was obtained from photometric observations by American astronomer Robert Stephens at the Goat Mountain Astronomical Research Station in California. Lightcurve analysis gave a rotation period of 11.32 hours with a brightness amplitude of 0.35 magnitude.

Diameter and albedo 

According to the surveys carried out by the Infrared Astronomical Satellite IRAS, the Japanese Akari satellite and the NEOWISE mission of NASA's Wide-field Infrared Survey Explorer, Gellivara measures between 22.10 and 35.73 kilometers in diameter and its surface has an albedo between 0.0241 and 0.07. The Collaborative Asteroid Lightcurve Link agrees with IRAS and derives an albedo of 0.0289 with a diameter of 35.76 kilometers based on an absolute magnitude of 11.7.

References

External links 
 Lightcurve Database Query (LCDB), at www.minorplanet.info
 Dictionary of Minor Planet Names, Google books
 Asteroids and comets rotation curves, CdR – Geneva Observatory, Raoul Behrend
 Discovery Circumstances: Numbered Minor Planets (1)-(5000) – Minor Planet Center
 
 

001073
Discoveries by Johann Palisa
Named minor planets
19230914